Bob Wiggins (8 November 1925 – 29 August 2002) was  a former Australian rules footballer who played with Richmond in the Victorian Football League (VFL).

Notes

External links 
		

1925 births
2002 deaths
Australian rules footballers from Victoria (Australia)
Richmond Football Club players